The Daniel Nichols Homestead is a historic home in Reading, Massachusetts.  The oldest portion of this timber-frame house was built in the early 1740, with vernacular Georgian styling.  The house is five bays wide and two deep, with a rear shed-roof extension giving the house a saltbox appearance.  An ell was added in the mid-19th century.  The main architectural detail is the front door surround, which features sidelight windows and recessed, paneled pilasters supporting a tall entablature.

The house was listed on the National Register of Historic Places in 1984.

See also
National Register of Historic Places listings in Reading, Massachusetts
National Register of Historic Places listings in Middlesex County, Massachusetts

References

Houses on the National Register of Historic Places in Reading, Massachusetts
Houses in Reading, Massachusetts
1742 establishments in Massachusetts